Stanley Vickers is the name of:

Stan Vickers (1932–2013), British race walker
Stanley Vickers (MP) (1837–1872), British member of parliament for Wallingford 1868–1862